Séraphin-Médéric Mieusement (Gonneville-la-Mallet March 12, 1840 – September 10, 1905 Pornic) was a 19th-century French architectural photographer. He worked chiefly from Blois.

He specialized in French monument historique photographic documentation, and after 1881 was assigned to photograph all the cathedrals of France for the Ministère des cultes.

Biography

Bibliography 
 Farid Abdelouahab (ed.) Regards objectifs: Mieusement et Lesueur, photographes à Blois. Exh. cat. Paris, Somogy, 2000, 183 p.

 Gilbert Beaugé. La photographie en Provence 1839–1895. Paris: Jeanne Laffitte, 1995, 175 p.

References

External links 
BnF Data for "Séraphin-Médéric Mieusement (1840-1905)"
 Digital Collections from the INHA Library

J. Paul Getty Museum for "Médéric Mieusement"

See also

Architectural photographers
1840 births
1905 deaths
19th-century French photographers